Hague is an unincorporated community in Westmoreland County, in the U. S. state of Virginia.

The Morgan Jones 1677 Pottery Kiln and Mount Pleasant are listed on the National Register of Historic Places.

References

Unincorporated communities in Virginia
Unincorporated communities in Westmoreland County, Virginia